Neuvy-Deux-Clochers is a commune in the Cher department in the Centre-Val de Loire region of France.

Geography

Population

Sights
 The church of St. Jean-Baptiste, dating from the twelfth century.
 The tower of the 12th-century Vèvre castle at the hamlet of La Tour.

See also
Communes of the Cher department

References

External links

Official commune website  
 The castle website  

Communes of Cher (department)